Hajtovka (Haitivka) is a village and municipality in Stará Ľubovňa District in the Prešov Region of northern Slovakia.

History
In historical records the village was first mentioned in 1427.

Geography
The municipality lies at an altitude of 525 metres and covers an area of 3.047 km². It has a population of about 91 people.

Genealogical resources

The records for genealogical research are available at the state archive "Statny Archiv in Presov, Slovakia"

 Roman Catholic church records (births/marriages/deaths): 1686-1924 (parish B)
 Greek Catholic church records (births/marriages/deaths): 1827-1933 (parish B)

See also
 List of municipalities and towns in Slovakia

External links
Hajtovka - The Carpathian Connection
http://www.statistics.sk/mosmis/eng/run.html 
Surnames of living people in Hajtovka

Villages and municipalities in Stará Ľubovňa District
Šariš